Frederick William Groves (13 January 1891 – 1965) was an English professional football forward, who played in the Football League for Brighton & Hove Albion, Arsenal, Glossop and Charlton Athletic. He made over 130 appearances for Arsenal in wartime football.

Life and career
Born in Shadwell, London, Groves played as a forward, either as inside forward or centre forward. He started his career at Glossop before moving to Woolwich Arsenal as an amateur in August 1912, turning professional in October 1913. He made his debut against Derby County on 7 December 1912, playing three games in Woolwich Arsenal's relegation season of 1912–13, after which they moved to Arsenal Stadium in north London and dropped the "Woolwich" from their name.
	 
He continued to be a bit-part player in the two seasons Arsenal spent in the Football League Second Division, playing just five games in two years. After first-class football was suspended for the First World War, Groves found more chances to play in the side in wartime games, and made 133 appearances in wartime matches for Arsenal, and was a semi-regular on the resumption of League football in 1919–20, playing 29 League games that season (as Arsenal had since been elected to the First Division). He played another 13 the following season, before leaving the club in August 1921; in total he played 53 games in League and FA Cup for Arsenal, scoring seven goals.
	 
He saw out his career, firstly at Brighton & Hove Albion for three years, and then Charlton Athletic in 1924–25.

Career statistics

References

1891 births
1965 deaths
Date of death missing
People from Shadwell
English footballers
Association football inside forwards
Association football outside forwards
Glossop North End A.F.C. players
Arsenal F.C. players
Brighton & Hove Albion F.C. players
Charlton Athletic F.C. players
Dartford F.C. players
English Football League players
Southern Football League players
Brentford F.C. wartime guest players